Macdonald Block may refer to:

 Macdonald Block (Victoria, British Columbia)
 Macdonald Block Complex, Toronto